There have been two baronetcies created for persons with the surname Champneys, one in the Baronetage of Great Britain and one in the Baronetage of the United Kingdom. Both creations are extinct.

The Champneys, later Mostyn-Champneys Baronetcy, of Orchardleigh in the County of Somerset, was created in the Baronetage of Great Britain on 12 January 1767. For more information on this creation, see Mostyn-Champneys baronets.

The Champneys, later Dalrymple-Champneys Baronetcy, of Littlemeads in the County of Sussex, was created in the Baronetage of the United Kingdom on 13 July 1910. For more information on this creation, see Dalrymple-Champneys baronets.

Champneys, later Mostyn-Champneys baronets, of Orchardleigh (1767)
see Mostyn-Champneys baronets

Champneys, later Dalrymple-Champneys baronets, of Littlemeads (1910)
see Dalrymple-Champneys baronets

References

Extinct baronetcies in the Baronetage of Great Britain
Extinct baronetcies in the Baronetage of the United Kingdom